The German Soap Award began for the first time in 2011 as an event organised by mypromi.de and VIPshare Media for German Soap Operas and Telenovelas. The awards started because more than 33 million viewers watch the series, yet its actors and actresses have barely been acknowledged, often overlooked in other award ceremonies, not taking their acting abilities serious. The Nominees in each category are chosen by a jury and then the winner of the award are determined by a vote on the Internet.

German Soap Award 2011 
The first German Soap Awards held on 4 June 2011 at the Hotel Grand Elysée Hamburg. The event was organized by Sören Bauer Events from Hamburg. Protagonists of telenovelas and soap operas were nominated in eleven categories. Over 750,000 people took part in the voting. Pete Dwojak the former actor from Gute Zeiten, schlechte Zeiten presented the evening.

Best Daily Soap Actress

Best Daily Soap Actor

Best Telenovela Actress

Best Telenovela Actor

Best Lovers

Best Villain

Best Newcomer

Sexiest Woman

Sexiest Man

Female Fan Favourite
For the Female Fan Favourite there were no nominations. All actresses of all telenovelas and soap operas could be chosen.

Male Fan Favourite
For the Male Fan Favourite there were no nominations. All actors of all telenovelas and soap operas could be chosen.

German Soap Award 2012 
The second German Soap Awards was held on 26 October 2012 in the former Greater Berlin cinema Kosmos. Protagonists of telenovelas and soap operas were nominated in nine categories.

Best Actress

Best Actor

Best Lovers

Best Villain

Best Newcomer

Sexiest Woman

Sexiest Man

Female Fan Favourite
For the Female Fan Favourite there were no nominations. All actresses of all telenovelas and soap operas could be chosen.

Male Fan Favourite
For the Male Fan Favourite there were no nominations. All actors of all telenovelas and soap operas could be chosen.

Jury Prize

Ehrenpreis

External links

References

German television awards